Karim Hakimi (Persian: کریم حکیمی) (born 1933) is an Iranian-Canadian entrepreneur and optician, known for founding Hakim Optical, a large chain of eyeglass stores across Canada.

Early life
Hakimi was born in Iran. At the age of five, his father died, forcing Hakimi to leave school to work to support his family. He found work in Iran grinding discarded window glass into lenses for magnifying glasses and eyeglasses. This experience taught him much about the techniques and equipment needed by an optician.

At 14, Hakimi attended night school to complete his elementary education, learning to read and write. Later, following service in the Iranian navy, he immigrated first to Germany and then to Switzerland, where he furthered his education in the optician's craft.

Career
Hakimi finally settled in Toronto, Ontario, Canada, where he found work in the field of ophthalmic lens grinding. He saved his money until he could start his own shop.

In 1967, Hakimi opened his own lens-grinding laboratory in the former Elwood Hotel in Toronto, buying and rebuilding equipment from a shuttered facility in Chicago. At first, he sold his lenses door-to-door, directly to optician shops. Soon he was able to save enough money to open his first retail shop, selling glasses by day and working nights to fulfil orders.

At first, Hakimi offered glasses for /pair ($12 for bifocals), which far undersold any competitors. He was able to raise his prices 50 percent from this starting point while still underselling his competitors and assuring continued demand for his glasses.

From this beginning as a single retail outlet, Hakimi has built Hakim Optical into a national chain of over 150 outlets with over 600 employees serving the eastern provinces of Canada.

Awards and recognition
Based on Hakimi's "rags-to-riches" success, he has been widely recognized as an outstanding immigrant to Canada.
 2005: He was knighted by the Sovereign Military Order of Malta in a Ceremony at Queen's Park in Toronto. 
 2008: Recognized by the City of Toronto by renaming Scarborough Street to Hakimi Avenue in his honor
 2011: Named one of Top 25 Canadian Immigrant Award winners by Canadian Immigrant
 2012: Awarded the Queen Elizabeth II Diamond Jubilee Medal
 2014: The City of Toronto renamed a portion of Lebovic Avenue "Hakimi Avenue" in honour of Hakimi. At the northwest corner of Hakimi and Eglinton Avenue is a Hakim Optical store.
 2016: Lebovic LRT stop is renamed "Hakimi Lebovic stop" to represent the street where the stop will be located.

References

Canadian businesspeople
Living people
1933 births
Iranian emigrants to Canada